Fast and Furry-ous is a 1949 Warner Bros. Looney Tunes cartoon, directed by Chuck Jones and written by Michael Maltese. The short was released on September 17, 1949, and stars Wile E. Coyote and the Road Runner, in their debut.

This was the debut of the Coyote/Road Runner pairing and set the template for the series, in which Wile E. Coyote (here given the mock genus/species name in faux-Latin Carnivorous Vulgaris) tries to catch the Road Runner (Accelleratii Incredibus) through many traps, plans and products. In this first cartoon, not all of the products are yet made by ACME.

The title is a play on the expression "fast and furious".

Plot 
When Wile E.Coyote first tries to stab Road Runner with a knife, he realizes he's not fast enough to outrun Road Runner. After 11 more ideas fail, Road Runner is seen as a passenger in the rear window of a bus that crushes Wile E., who was waiting with an axe.

Reception 
Warner Bros. writer and editor Charles Carney writes, "This initial outing created in seven minutes a timeless screen legend as durable as Charlie Chaplin, Buster Keaton and Oliver Hardy. Coyote's basic 'humanity' in simply following his instincts — with the help of an arsenal of devices that defy the laws of physics and momentum but always, eventually, yield to gravity — makes him a character of great sympathy... The would-be predator's imploring looks to the audience bring the humor from the cinematic to the personal." In 2021, Mark Wilson at Fast Company listed this one of the cartoons to watch before Space Jam: A New Legacy. Wilson states "Road Runner and Coyote went on to appear in dozens of shorts together, but my favorite gag is in this particular cartoon. Coyote paints a tunnel on the side of the mountain, hoping Road Runner will strike the rock by mistake," and mentions how the universe is "set up against him," due the fact that the Road Runner runs through as if no wall is there, while the Coyote doesn't.

Usage in other media
The entire scene of Wile E. donning the ACME Super Outfit is edited into The Bugs Bunny Road Runner Movie in 1979.

Clips of the cartoon are also featured in the 1993 film Last Action Hero and the 2011 remake of Arthur.

Home media 
Fast and Furry-ous is available in its blue ribbon reissue on Looney Tunes Golden Collection: Volume 1, Looney Tunes: Spotlight Collection, and Looney Tunes Platinum Collection: Volume 1 in 1080p resolution. It is also available on the "Road Runner Vs. Wile E. Coyote: The Classic Chase" VHS, the "Stars Of Space Jam: Wile E. Coyote And Road Runner" VHS and DVD, and the "Road Runner Vs. Wile E. Coyote: If At First You Don't Succeed..." Laserdisc.

Music 
This short uses music from the Bedřich Smetana opera The Bartered Bride, specifically Dance of the Comedians.  It also makes use of the popular songs "Winter", "I'm Looking Over a Four Leaf Clover", and "In My Merry Oldsmobile".

"Flight of the Bumblebee" by Nikolai Rimsky-Korsakov Would Be Used in the 2008 rhythm game Looney Tunes: Cartoon Conductor.

Censorship 
The version shown on ABC's The Bugs Bunny and Tweety Show cuts the part where Wile E. Coyote plants dynamite in the road and gets blown up when he presses the detonator.

See also 
 Looney Tunes and Merrie Melodies filmography (1940–1949)

References

External links 
 
 

1949 short films
1949 animated films
Looney Tunes shorts
Films about Canis
Short films directed by Chuck Jones
Wile E. Coyote and the Road Runner films
1940s Warner Bros. animated short films
Films scored by Carl Stalling
Animated films about mammals
Animated films about birds
Animated films without speech
Films with screenplays by Michael Maltese
Films produced by Edward Selzer
American animated short films

es:Fast and Furious